The 1961 Los Angeles Dodgers finished in second place in the National League with a record of 89–65, four games behind the Cincinnati Reds. 1961 was the fourth season for the Dodgers in Los Angeles. It was also the Dodgers final season of playing their home games at the Los Angeles Memorial Coliseum, since they moved to their new stadium the following season.

Offseason 
 November 28, 1960: Ray Semproch was drafted by the Washington Senators from the Dodgers in the 1960 rule 5 draft.
 December 15, 1960: Earl Robinson was purchased from the Dodgers by the Baltimore Orioles.
 December 16, 1960: Danny McDevitt was purchased from the Dodgers by the New York Yankees.
 January 31, 1961: Joe Pignatano was purchased from the Dodgers by the Kansas City Athletics.
 March 30, 1961: Ed Rakow was traded by the Dodgers to the Kansas City Athletics for Howie Reed and cash.

Regular season 
On April 17, 1961, Duke Snider hit his 370th career home run, which at the time moved him into 7th place on the all-time career home runs list. Later in the same game, Snider suffered a broken elbow, and he was knocked out for a good part of the season when he was hit by a pitch from Bob Gibson of the Cardinals.

Season standings

Record vs. opponents

Opening Day lineup

Notable transactions 
 May 4, 1961: Don Demeter and Charley Smith were traded by the Dodgers to the Philadelphia Phillies for Turk Farrell and Joe Koppe.
 May 26, 1961: Art Fowler was purchased from the Dodgers by the Los Angeles Angels.
 May 30, 1961: Bob Lillis and Carl Warwick were traded by the Dodgers to the St. Louis Cardinals for Daryl Spencer.

Roster

Player stats

Batting

Starters by position 
Note: Pos = Position; G = Games played; AB = At bats; H = Hits; Avg. = Batting average; HR = Home runs; RBI = Runs batted in

Other batters 
Note: G = Games played; AB = At bats; H = Hits; Avg. = Batting average; HR = Home runs; RBI = Runs batted in

Pitching

Starting pitchers 
Note: G = Games pitched; IP = Innings pitched; W = Wins; L = Losses; ERA = Earned run average; SO = Strikeouts

Other pitchers 
Note: G = Games pitched; IP = Innings pitched; W = Wins; L = Losses; ERA = Earned run average; SO = Strikeouts

Relief pitchers 
Note: G = Games pitched; W = Wins; L = Losses; SV = Saves; ERA = Earned run average; SO = Strikeouts

Awards and honors 
Gold Glove Award
Maury Wills
Johnny Roseboro

All-Stars 
1961 Major League Baseball All-Star Game – Game 1
Maury Wills starter
Sandy Koufax reserve
Johnny Roseboro reserve
1961 Major League Baseball All-Star Game – Game 2
Maury Wills starter
Don Drysdale reserve
Sandy Koufax reserve
Johnny Roseboro reserve
TSN National League All-Star
Maury Wills

Farm system 

LEAGUE CHAMPIONS: Great Falls, Reno

References

External links 
Baseball-Reference season page
Baseball Almanac season page
1961 Los Angeles Dodgers uniform
Los Angeles Dodgers official web site
1961 Dodgers Roster through baseball cards

Los Angeles Dodgers seasons
Los Angeles Dodgers season
Los Angel